Tidy Towns (Irish: Bailte Slachtmhara) is an annual competition, first held in 1958, organised by the Department of Rural and Community Development in order to honour the tidiest and most attractive cities, towns and villages in the Republic of Ireland.
The competition is organised on a national basis, and entrants must complete modules including Overall Developmental Approach (5 Year Plan), The Built Environment, Landscaping, Wildlife & Natural Amenities, Litter Control, Tidiness, Waste Minimisation, Residential Areas, Roads and Streets & Back Areas.

The Competition is judged during the summer months (May to August) by an independent adjudicator, who issues each town with a written report complimenting positive development and actions and providing positive suggestions on how the community can improve their general surroundings.

This competition covers many aspects of environment and prizes are awarded to winners of all areas. Other than that, there's an overall winner which is named as "Ireland's Tidiest Town" which is announced at the end of competition every September.

The 2020 competition was cancelled by Minister Michael Ring due to the COVID-19 pandemic in the Republic of Ireland for the first time in its history.

Winners

Summary map

References

External links
 Tidy Towns website
 The Tidy Towns of Ireland "Celebrating 50 years"
Donnybrook Tidy Towns Website

1958 establishments in Ireland
Awards established in 1958
Community awards
Irish awards